is a Japanese painter, illustrator, and manga artist. His works of shōjo manga (girls' manga) are noted for significantly influencing the aesthetic styles of that genre.

Biography
Macoto Takahashi was born on 27 August 1934 in Sumiyoshi-ku, Osaka, as the eldest son of a family of three boys. While pursuing art in high school, he was torn between the painting styles of nihonga (traditional Japanese-style painting) and yōga (Western-style painting). He decided to pursue jojōga 叙情画 (lyrical painting) after discovering the works of jojōga artist Jun'ichi Nakahara in the magazine Himawari. He began his career in 1953 illustrating books aimed at the loan market (kashi-hon). He began to create manga in 1956 with the shōjo manga (girls' manga) series Paris-Tokyo. That same year, he contributed to the nascent gekiga scene by adapting Sherlock Holmes stories for the kashi-hon manga magazine Kage. 

In 1958, he established what would become his signature style of art influenced by both manga and jojōga with his manga series , published in the magazine Shojo. This style was distinguished chiefly by its depiction of characters with traits typical of models in jojōga illustrations: thin bodies and large, sparkling eyes, with Takahashi having been referred to as "the king of eye sparkles." Other distinguishing traits include the superposition of panels, full-length portraits that fill the entirety of the page, backgrounds that arouse strong emotion, and non-narrative imagery. This style significantly influenced shōjo manga, and quickly became the standard visual conventions of that genre. Takahashi also made the theme of ballet popular in shōjo manga with Norowareta Kopperia (Cursed Coppelia).

During the 1960s, Takahashi stopped creating shōjo manga, because he considered himself incapable of adopting the point of view of a girl. He shifted to illustration, creating album cover artwork, stationery, and covers of shōjo manga magazines, and became particularly popular with the Gothic Lolita subculture. In 2018, artwork by Takahashi was featured in designs created by the fashion house Comme des Garçons.

Works
 , 1995, Seibidō Shuppan. Reprinted 2006, BOOK-ING, 
 , 1999, Parco Shuppan, 
 , 2001, Parco Shuppan, 
 , 2006 (reprint), Shogakukan, 
 , 2006, Kodansha, 
 , 2013, PIE International, 
 , 2015 (reprint), Fukkan dot-com, 
 , 2016, Genkōsha, 
 , 2017, PIE International,

References

Bibliography

External links
 
 
 Macoto Couture (Macoto Takahashi's shop)

1934 births
Living people
Japanese illustrators
Japanese painters
Manga artists from Osaka Prefecture